Sons of Dan may refer to:

 Nine Sons Of Dan, an Australian band from the Gold Coast
 Danite, a Mormon group